The Jetour X95 is a mid-size crossover produced by Chery under the Jetour brand (division of Chery Commercial Vehicle).

Overview

The X95 was presented at the Auto Shanghai in April 2019.  The up to seven-seater vehicle has been sold in China since November 2019.

Chery Tiggo 7, Chery Tiggo 8 and Jetour X90 use the same technology.

The SUV is powered by a supercharged 1.5-liter petrol engine with an output of 115 kW (156 hp) or a supercharged 1.6-liter petrol engine with an output of 145 kW (197 hp). These engines are used in other Chery Automobile SUV models.

References

External links
Official website (X95)

Mid-size sport utility vehicles
Crossover sport utility vehicles
Cars introduced in 2019
Cars of China